The 2022 Bolton Metropolitan Borough Council election took place on 5 May 2022. One third of councillors—20 out of 60—were be elected. The election took place alongside other local elections across the United Kingdom.

In the previous council election in 2021, the council remained under no overall control. The Conservatives continued running a minority administration with a confidence and supply arrangement with smaller parties, as they had done prior to the election. Labour formed the main opposition with nineteen seats to the Conservatives' twenty.

Background 

The Local Government Act 1972 created a two-tier system of metropolitan counties and districts covering Greater Manchester, Merseyside, South Yorkshire, Tyne and Wear, the West Midlands, and West Yorkshire starting in 1974. Bolton was a district of the Greater Manchester metropolitan county. The Local Government Act 1985 abolished the metropolitan counties, with metropolitan districts taking on most of their powers as metropolitan boroughs. The Greater Manchester Combined Authority was created in 2011 and began electing the mayor of Greater Manchester from 2017, which was given strategic powers covering a region coterminous with the former Greater Manchester metropolitan county.

Since its formation, Bolton Council has variously been under Labour control, Conservative control and no overall control. Labour most recently regained its majority in the 2011 council election, which it held until the 2019 election. After the 2019 election, Labour held 23 seats with the Conservatives on 20, the Liberal Democrats on 6, the local party Farnworth and Kearsley First on five, the UK Independence Party on three and the local party Horwich and Blackrod First on two, as well as one independent councillor. The Conservatives formed a confidence and supply agreement with the Liberal Democrats, Farnworth and Kearley First, Horwich and Blackrod First and the UK Independence Party so that they could form a minority administration. In the most recent election in 2021, the Conservatives became the largest party with 20 seats to Labour's nineteen, with seven independents, the Liberal Democrats and Farnworth and Kearsley First on five seats each, Horwich and Blackrod First on five and a single UK Independence Party councillor remaining. The Conservatives continued to run a minority administration with support from smaller parties. The Liberal Democrats ended their working arrangement with the Conservatives in January 2021. Marie Brady, the leader of the Horwich and Blackrod First party, defected to the Conservative Party after the two other councillors from her party voted against the Conservative budget.

The positions up for election in 2022 were last elected in 2018. In that election, the Conservatives won nine seats, Labour won eight, and the Liberal Democrats and Farnworth and Kealey First won two each.

Electoral process 

The council elects its councillors in thirds, with a third being up for election every year for three years, with no election in the fourth year. The election will take place by first-past-the-post voting, with wards generally being represented by three councillors, with one elected in each election year to serve a four-year term.

All registered electors (British, Irish, Commonwealth and European Union citizens) living in Bolton aged 18 or over will be entitled to vote in the election. People who live at two addresses in different councils, such as university students with different term-time and holiday addresses, are entitled to be registered for and vote in elections in both local authorities. Voting in-person at polling stations will take place from 07:00 to 22:00 on election day, and voters will be able to apply for postal votes or proxy votes in advance of the election.

Campaign 
The Conservative councillor Adele Warren said that increases in the cost of living would affect the election, with people "frightened about turning their electricity or heating on". She said that the Conservative chancellor of the Exchequer Rishi Sunak "could have gone much, much further" with measures to help people.

Previous council composition 

Changes:
 June 2021: Diane Parkinson re-joins Conservatives
 July 2021: David Greenhalgh (Conservative) dies; by-election held October 2021
 October 2021: Amy Cowen wins by-election for Conservatives
 February 2022: Shamim Abdullah leaves Labour to sit as an independent
 March 2022: Marie Brady leaves Horwich and Blackrod First for Conservatives
 Sean Hornby leaves UKIP to sit as an independent

Results summary

Ward results 
Statements of persons nominated were published on 6 April. Incumbent councillors are marked with an asterisk (*).

Astley Bridge

Bradshaw

Breightmet

Bromley Cross 

 Changes relative to 2021 by-election, won by Amy Cowan after the death of David Greenhalgh

Crompton

Farnworth

Great Lever

Halliwell

Harper Green

Heaton & Lostock

Horwich & Blackrod

Horwich North East

Hulton

Kearsley

Little Lever & Darcy Lever

Rumworth

Smithills

Tonge with the Haulgh

Westhoughton North & Chew Moor

Westhoughton South

By-Elections

Rumworth

References 

Bury
Bolton Metropolitan Borough Council elections